Hypotrachyna paraphyscioides is a species of foliose lichen in the family Parmeliaceae. Found in Colombia, it was described as new to science in 2011.

References

paraphyscioides
Lichen species
Lichens of Colombia
Lichens described in 2011
Taxa named by Harrie Sipman